Sékou Baradji (born 30 August 1995) is a French professional footballer who plays as a forward for RC Grasse.

Career
Baradji was in the youth system of Cergy Pontoise from the age of 8 until 2012. He then trialled with Elche and signed a contract with the Under-19s. He returned to France after three months to complete his education, joining the Under-19 sides of L'Entente SSG and then Racing CFF.

A knee injury sidelined him for 8 months, but he joined Olympique Montigny at level ten in the French football pyramid in January 2015, when contacted by a coach he had worked under at Racing CFF. He scored 15 goals in four months, and earned a move four levels up the pyramid to OFC Les Mureaux, where he was top scorer in Division d'Honneur with 18 goals in 20 matches.

For the 2016–17 season, Baradji signed with Boulogne-Billancourt  in Championnat National 2. After another good season he was signed by Red Star in June 2017.

At the end of December 2018, Baradji was loaned to Bourg-Péronnas until the end of the 2018–19 season, due to limited first team opportunities at Red Star.

In August 2020, Baradji left Red Star by mutual agreement. Before the end of the same month he signed with RC Grasse.

Notes

References

External links

Living people
1995 births
Association football forwards
French footballers
Ligue 2 players
Championnat National players
Championnat National 2 players
Cergy Pontoise FC players
Elche CF players
Entente SSG players
Racing Club de France Football players
AC Boulogne-Billancourt players
Red Star F.C. players
Football Bourg-en-Bresse Péronnas 01 players
RC Grasse players
French sportspeople of Malian descent
French sportspeople of Ivorian descent
Sportspeople from Pontoise
Footballers from Val-d'Oise